Dadar is a Census Town situated in Pen taluka Raigad district of Maharashtra, India. The Pen railway station serves as the nearest railway station and is located approximately 14 kilometers away from Dadar.

Geography
The total geographical area of the Dadar census town is 9 square kilometers which makes it the biggest census town by area in the pen taluka.

Demographics
The total population of Dadar consists of 5389 people, which makes it the biggest census town by area in the Raigad district.

Climate
The average rainfall per annum in the town is 2164.5 millimeters and the maximum temperature is 36.7° Celsius and the minimum temperature is 13.5° Celsius.

References

Cities and towns in Raigad district